Svein Maalen (born 25 February 1978) is a Norwegian football coach.

Maalen has previously worked at Rosenborg as a junior coach and worked with analytics. In the 2011 and 2012 season, Maalen was head coach of Kattem IL's women's team. They finished in ninth and eleventh place in the seasons Maalen was in charge of the team. He became assistant coach in Ranheim in 2013, a side then playing in 1. divisjon, the second tier of the Norwegian football league system. Ranheim's head coach Trond Nordsteien was sacked in May 2015, and Maalen took over as an interim head coach for a short period before the position was given to Ola By Rise for the rest of the 2015 season. Svein Maalen was appointed as Ranheim's head coach on a permanent basis in October 2015. He led Ranheim to promotion to Eliteserien by winning the 2017 Eliteserien play-offs. Despite coaching the club with the lowest budget in the league, Maalen and Ranheim managed to stay up in their first season back in the top division. They finished the 2018 Eliteserien in seventh place, and Maalen received the Eliteserien Coach of the Year award for this accomplishment.

Managerial statistics

Honours

Individual
Eliteserien Manager of the Year: 2018

References

1978 births
Living people
Sportspeople from Trondheim
Ranheim Fotball managers
Eliteserien managers
Norwegian football managers